Halida Khayrutdinova aka Halida Dinova is a Russian concert pianist. Tatar by nationality, she was born in Kazan, Russia.

Biography 
Her father, Afzal Khayrutdinov, was a Professor of Cello at the Kazan State Conservatory and her mother, Flora Khayrutdinova MD, was her first music instructor.  She is a sister of the acclaimed concert pianist Rustem Hayroudinoff, who is also a professor at the Royal Academy in London.

Halida Khayrutdinova graduated from the Kazan State Conservatory (Academy), named after N.G. Zhiganov, where she studied with Natalia Fomina and received her postgraduate degree in solo piano performance with Anatol Ugorski (Aspirantura for performers) at the Saint-Petersburg State Conservatory (Academy) named after N.A. Rimsky-Korsakov.  Immediately after graduation from St.Petersburg she taught full-time for four years at the Kazan State Conservatory, in the departments of Solo Piano Performance and Chamber Music.

Halida Khayrutdinova holds an Artist Diploma from the Cleveland Institute of Music where her primary performance area was Piano (under Paul Schenly) and Secondary Organ (under Adeline Huss).

Halida Dinova is happily married and divides her time between the US and Russia. Her performances have been broadcast on classical stations around the world and she has appeared in the award-winning documentary directed by Laura Paglin 'Shadow of the Swan - A Composer Story' alongside composer Dennis Eberhard, St.Petersburg State Capella Symphony Orchestra, conductor Alexander Chernushenko and the families of the men who perished in Kursk submarine disaster in the year 2000.

Halida Dinova is a Steinway Artist who has recorded CD's for various labels including Doremi, Chandos, Naxos and Cantius Classics.

Discography 
 Halida Dinova Plays Scriabin - DOREMI (DDR 71133)
 Bloch ConcertoSymphonique/Scherzo fantasque - CHANDOS (CHAN 10085)
 American Classics: Eberhard Piano Concerto 'Shadow of the Swan' - NAXOS ( 8 559 176)
 Brahms Piano concerto N2 Op.83, 8 Piano Pieces Op.76 with PAPSO /Gustavo Plis-Sterenberg cond. ( CC 101)
 Masterpieces for Children by Bach, Debussy, Schostakovich, Tchaikovsky (CC 102)
 Music That Tells Stories Sait-Saens, Wagner,  Scriabin, Tchaikovsky,  Balakirev, Bloch (CC 104)

External links 
 Personal web-page 
 Evening Kazan newspaper 
 Halida Dinova web site
 Halida Dinova plays Brahms - http://www.mvdaily.com
 Ivan March 'Bloch Works for piano and Orchestra' - http://www.gramophone.co.uk 9/2003

Year of birth missing (living people)
Living people
Russian musicians
Russian women musicians